Temminck's mouse (Mus musculoides) is a species of the genus Mus and of the subgenus Nannomys. It is found throughout West Africa, Central Africa, and East Africa. An adult generally weighs 0.006 kg.

References

Mus (rodent)
Mammals described in 1853